Georg Linnamäe (born 8 July 1998) is an Estonian rally driver. He is currently competing in World Rally Championship-2.

Rally victories

WRC-2 Junior victories

Results

WRC results

* Season still in progress.

WRC-2

* Season still in progress.

WRC-2 Junior/Challenger

* Season still in progress.

ERC results

* Season still in progress

References

External links
 https://sport.postimees.ee/7643104/georg-linnamae-tahab-jargmisel-aastal-muutusi-hooaeg-voib-alata-ullatava-ralliga
 https://sport.postimees.ee/7705895/suurte-ootustega-rootsi-soitev-linnamae-olen-veel-lihvimata-teemant

1998 births
Living people
Estonian rally drivers
Estonian rally co-drivers
World Rally Championship drivers
Sportspeople from Tallinn
21st-century Estonian people

European Rally Championship drivers